The Charleston Conference is an annual event for academic libraries and publishers, held in Charleston, South Carolina, in the United States.

History 
The conference was started in 1980 by Charleston librarian Katina Strauch. Strauch started the event after being unable to afford to attend the American Library Association's Annual conference. The first event was attended by two dozen librarians, and grew to 1600 attendees in 2012. Its focus is on acquisition for research and academic libraries, particularly on serials and academic books. It also covers library infrastructure topics, such as vendor systems and library technology. It is held in three historic hotels in the downtown area of Charleston. The conference is one of the only major library conferences in the United States that is independent from a large professional or trade organization.

References 

Library science
Conferences in the United States
1980 establishments in South Carolina